Eetti is a 1985 Indian Tamil-language action film directed by Rajasekhar. The film stars Vijayakanth, Vishnuvardhan and Nalini. It was released on 30 August 1985.

Plot 

Velan, a tribal hunter, living in a forest, highlighting his tragic love story with Valli. Police inspector Prasad battles bravely to capture a criminal gang that is responsible for making adulterated medicines that cause the death of many children, but he is instructed by corrupt politicians to set them free without any punishment. Vexed with the rampant corruption in the Indian system, Prasad goes to his girlfriend Lalitha's house, and learns about Velan and Valli from the forests of Thaalla Malai. Velan is a talented hunter. The touching narration follows the love story of Velan and Valli, delving into the culture and tradition of the tribal communities living in the forests and the challenges they face in a rapidly changing society. Then, in a tragic incident, Valli is raped by the arrogant son Sathyam of a wealthy estate owner and his friends, causing her to commit suicide. Following Valli's final wish Velan makes it his life's mission to murder the three men responsible for her death. Will Velan succeed in his task? Will Inspector Prasad succeed in capturing Velan before he is able to complete his mission? Will the rapists be brought to justice? How will Velan's future unfold?

Cast 
Vijayakanth as Velan
Vishnuvardhan as Inspector Prasad
Nalini as Lalitha
Viji as Valli
Sathyaraj as Sathyam
M. N. Nambiar
Goundamani

Soundtrack 
Soundtrack was composed by Ilaiyaraaja.

Reception 
Jayamanmadhan of Kalki wrote that if viewers see why the director did not involve them along with the film, it is because the screenplay needs a lot of tonic and nutrition.

References

External links 
 

1980s Tamil-language films
1985 action films
1985 films
Films about revenge
Films directed by Rajasekhar (director)
Films scored by Ilaiyaraaja
Films set in forests
Indian action films